Frame Technology may refer to:

 Frame technology (software engineering), a modularity framework
 Frame Technology Corporation, the original developers of the desktop publishing software Adobe FrameMaker